Voidomatis is a river in the Ioannina regional unit in northwestern Greece, and is a tributary of the Aoös river. The main current sources are located under the village of Vikos. Along its path it converges with other water currents originating from the banks of Tymfi or the Vikos Gorge. It ends close to Konitsa. The river has a total length of 15 kilometers. The name Voidomatis (meaning "the eye of the ox"), derives from the fact that oxen have clear blue eyes, like the waters of this river. Also, there is the Slavic etymology:  Bode–Mat which means "good water".

Voidomatis has been characterized as one of the cleanest rivers in Europe as it does not face any environmental issues. It crosses one of the most beautiful natural locations of Greece and has been part of the Vikos–Aoös National Park since 1973. The river is spanned by a number of stone bridges, the most famous being the Kledonas Bridge. The river is known for water sports such as rafting and kayaking.

Geomorphology 
The Voidomatis is mostly seasonal, with year-round flow. The average temperature of the water does not exceed 4 °C.

References
 Travel Magic. (2009). ΒΟΪΔΟΜΑΤΗΣ ΠΟΤΑΜΟΣ. Retrieved July 6, 2013

External links

Pindus
Landforms of Ioannina (regional unit)
Rivers of Greece
Rivers of Epirus (region)
Natura 2000 in Greece